DHC  may refer to:

Arts and entertainment
 Dance Hall Crashers, a popular Ska punk band
 Discovery Health Channel, part of US Discovery TV channel

Aviation
 de Havilland Canada, Canadian aircraft manufacturer:
DHC-1 Chipmunk
DHC-2 Beaver
DHC-3 Otter
DHC-4 Caribou
DHC-5 Buffalo
DHC-6 Twin Otter
DHC-7 Dash 7
DHC-8 Dash 8

Business
 Daigaku Honyaku Center, a Japanese manufacturer of cosmetics and health foods
 Dalian Hi-Think Computer, a Chinese outsourcing company
 DHC Software, a Chinese company

Chemistry
 Dihydrocapsaicin, a capsaicinoid occurring in pepper
 Dihydrochalcone, a chemical compound
Dihydrocodeine

Sports
 Dudley Hewitt Cup, Canadian ice hockey trophy
 Xerxes/DHC, a former Dutch professional football team

Other
 District heating and Cooling
 Diocese of the Holy Cross, of the US Anglican Church
 Doctor honoris causa, an honorary degree
 Drop-Head Coupe, a British term for a convertible car
 Brave New World  Linda's father